Marla is a female given name in English. It is a variant of the name Marlene, which comes from Mary Magdalene, the biblical woman to whom Jesus Christ first appeared after his resurrection.

People named Marla
 Marla Adams, American soap opera actress
 Marla Gibbs, American actress
 Marla Glen, American jazz singer
 Marla Hanson, American screenwriter and ex-model, attack victim
 Marla Heasley, American film and TV actress
 Marla Landi, British film actress
 Marla Lukofsky, Canadian stand-up comedian
 Marla Maples (Trump), American actress and model, married to Donald Trump from 1993 to 1997
 Marla Olmstead, American artist, considered to be a child prodigy of abstract art
 Marla Pennington, American actress
 Marla Runyan, American marathon runner, legally blind
 Marla Ruzicka, American activist and aid worker, killed by a car-bomb in Iraq
 Marla Shapiro, Canadian medical reporter
 Marla Sokoloff, American actress
 Marla Streb, professional mountain bike racer

In fiction
 Marla McGivers, Star Trek: historian aboard the USS Enterprise (NCC-1701)
 Marla Singer, female character from the 1996 novel Fight Club
 Marla, Colonel Raeburn's Venusian secretary in the 1962 television series Space Patrol
 Marla Grayson, the main character in the 2020 black comedy film I Care a Lot

Other
Marla faith, the traditional religion of the Mari people of the republic of Mari El, Russia
Marla (unit), a unit of measuring land (surface) in Southern Asia approximately equal to 25 sq yards or

Places
 Marla, South Australia, a town and locality
Marla Airport

See also
Mala (disambiguation)